The 1993–94 Scottish Second Division was won by Stranraer who were promoted to the First Division.

Relegation

Due to the introduction of a new Scottish Third Division for the 1994–95 season 8 teams were relegated to create the new league these were: 
Alloa Athletic, Forfar Athletic, East Stirlingshire, Montrose, Queen's Park, Arbroath, Albion Rovers and Cowdenbeath.

Table

References 

 Scottish Football Archive

Scottish Second Division seasons
Scot
3